The women's BMX race competition at the 2018 Asian Games in Jakarta was held on 25 August at the Pulomas International BMX Center.

Schedule
All times are Western Indonesia Time (UTC+07:00)

Results 
Legend
DNS — Did not start

Seeding run

Motos

Heat 1

Heat 2

Final

References

External links
Results

BMX Women